Tiffany Stevenson (born 29 September 1978) is an English stand-up comedian, writer and actress.

Career
Stevenson started her career as an actress. Her credits include The Office, Days That Shook the World, People Just Do Nothing and Roisin Conaty's GameFace.

Stevenson has been doing stand-up comedy since 2006, which was also the year she first performed at the Edinburgh Fringe. Her solo debut was in Along Came A Spider (2009). Her subsequent Edinburgh shows were Dictators (2010), Cavewoman (2011), Uncomfortably Numb (2012), Optimist (2014), Mad Man (2015), Seven (2016), and Bombshell (2017). Bombshell was listed among the "Best-Reviewed Edinburgh Shows 2017". Her 2019 Edinburgh show was titled Mother, Stevenson planned to take it on tour in the UK and in the US after that year's festival.

She has been hosting the weekly comedy live show Old Rope in London where comedians showcase new material since 2009.

In 2011, Stevenson finished third on the ITV reality show Show Me the Funny.

Stevenson sings and plays the guitar. She sang with Craig Robinson at The Improv in Los Angeles in 2019 when he spontaneously asked her to join him on stage to do her "Stevie Nicks turns into Cartman" version of "Dreams". They had been introduced only minutes before because Robinson was on The Office (US) and Stevenson was on the original UK show.

Personal life
Stevenson grew up in Greenford, West London. Her father is originally from Prestwick in Scotland but moved to England as a teenager. Her grandmother is from St. Andrews. Her partner Paul is also Scottish and frequently features in her stand-up shows as "Scottish Boyfriend Explains A Hing". She has a sister. Stevenson describes her parents' marriage as "a mixed-class relationship" because her father is from a wealthy Scottish-Presbyterian family and her mother is from a working-class Welsh-Kale Romani family.

Her father managed Wembley Stadium in the 1980s. When she was a young child she met stars like Annie Lennox and Freddie Mercury through her father's work at Wembley. Stevenson describes herself as "not really impressed by anyone" which she credits partly to meeting such stars frequently when she was very young and partly to becoming "jaded and cynical" when she saw many of her father's former friends disappearing from their lives after he had lost his job at Wembley. Very early on in her career, a manager told her to change her last name from Stevenson-Oake to just Stevenson because the double-barrelled name made her sound "posh" while she was not posh.

Stevenson lives in North London with her partner and a cat.

References

External links
 
 
 

English women comedians
Living people
1978 births
English people of Scottish descent
English people of Welsh descent
Comedians from London
Actresses from London
21st-century English actresses
21st-century English comedians
Welsh Romani people